Thomas Francis Kelly (April 6, 1925 – January 26, 2016), professionally known as Tommy Kelly, was an American child actor. He played the title role in The Adventures of Tom Sawyer in 1938 based on Mark Twain's novel of the same name.

Early life and career
Kelly was born in the Bronx, the son of Nora and Michael Kelly, a fireman, in humble circumstances. He had twelve siblings. Kelly's grandparents, all four, were from Ireland. He began his acting career at the age of twelve when he was selected to play Tom Sawyer in the 1938 movie The Adventures of Tom Sawyer, the first Technicolor adaption of Mark Twain's classic 1876 novel. Approximately 25,000 boys had auditioned for that role and it is said that famous producer David O. Selznick handpicked Kelly for the role. Despite Kelly's earning good critical reviews for his performance, the film was only a poor financial success. He also played the lead role in Peck's Bad Boy with the Circus later that year as Bill Peck.

In 1939, Tommy Kelly had a small but memorable part in Gone with the Wind as the boy crying in a band playing "Dixie" in Atlanta while the death lists are given out. He played the notable supporting role of Willie in Archie Mayo's musical film They Shall Have Music (1939) followed by a leading role as a young cadet in the B movie Military Academy (1940). As he reached adulthood, Kelly's roles in movies were minor and he was often uncredited. He appeared in The Magnificent Yankee in 1950, which turned out to be his last of 19 films before ending his acting career.

As with many other stars, the war years found Tommy in the U.S. Army; he served in the infantry rather than the   USO, as did some other child stars. He fought in the European theater, participating in the critical campaign for the bridge at Remagen.

Personal life and death
After his Hollywood days, Tommy Kelly earned a Ph.D. from Michigan State. He worked as a high school teacher and counselor in Culver City and later as an administrator in the Orange County, Florida school system. He worked in Liberia as an administrator for the Peace Corps towards the end of the 1960s. He afterwards served as superintendent of international schools in Liberia and Venezuela. He eventually returned to the United States and worked in an important position at the U.S. Department of Agriculture in Washington. Ever conscious of the value of education, in his thesis he focused, among other things, on the relative advantages of children who were educated in U.S. military dependent schools abroad. "Dr. Kelly" served as an International Relations Advisor in the International Organization Affairs (IOA) unit of the Office of International Cooperation and Development (OICD) of the U.S. Department of Agriculture, where he prepared positions for the Office of the Secretary of Agriculture, with personal responsibility for OECD, and United States delegations to the governing boards of United Nations Organizations concerned with Food and Agriculture, a position he held until his retirement from federal service. 

Kelly was generally reticent about his years as an actor after retiring from Hollywood at the age of 25. He married Sue Kelly in 1948; they were married for 67 years, until his death. Kelly died on January 26, 2016, in Greensboro, North Carolina, at age 90 from congestive heart failure. He was survived by his wife, six children, twelve grandchildren and two great-grandchildren.

Filmography

Film

References

External links

1925 births
2016 deaths
American male film actors
American male child actors
United States Army personnel of World War II
Male actors from New York City
United States Army soldiers
Michigan State University alumni
Peace Corps people
United States Department of Agriculture officials